Huadong Subdistrict is a subdistrict in Huanghua, Hebei, China. , it has 5 residential communities under its administration.

See also 
 List of township-level divisions of Hebei

References 

Township-level divisions of Hebei
Huanghua